Robots is an upcoming American science fiction romantic comedy film written and directed by Anthony Hines and Casper Christensen and starring Shailene Woodley and Jack Whitehall.  It is based on a short story by Robert Sheckley.

Cast
Shailene Woodley as Elaine
Jack Whitehall as Charles
 Case Matthews as Officer Bishop
Jackamoe Buzzell as Sheriff Bill Horton

Production
Emma Roberts was initially cast until Woodley replaced her.

Filming occurred in New Mexico in August 2021.

References

https://moviesr.net/amp-p-sci-fi-comedy-movie-robots-officially-wraps-up-filming

External links
 

Upcoming films
American science fiction comedy films
American romantic comedy films
Films shot in New Mexico